Arthur Mendonça Cabral (born 25 April 1998) is a Brazilian professional footballer who plays as a forward for Serie A side Fiorentina.

Club career

Ceará
Born in Campina Grande, Paraíba, Cabral joined Ceará's youth setup in 2014. He made his first team debut on 22 July 2015, coming on as a late substitute and scoring a last-minute winner in a 2–1 away victory against Tupi, for the year's Copa do Brasil.

In October 2015, Cabral was loaned to Palmeiras and returned to the youth setup. Back to Ceará in the following year, he spent some time in the under-20 squad before being definitely promoted to the first team in the 2017 season.

Cabral contributed with four goals in 16 matches during the 2017 Campeonato Brasileiro Série B, as his side achieved promotion to Série A. On 7 March 2018, he scored a brace in a 3–0 Campeonato Cearense away win against Ferroviário-CE.

Palmeiras
On 30 November 2018, Palmeiras officially signed Cabral for R$ 5,000,000 from Ceará. Here, he played three league matches, scoring one goal.

Basel
On 30 September 2019, Cabral was loaned to FC Basel in the Swiss Super League for their 2019–20 season under manager Marcel Koller. He made his team debut in the Swiss Cup match on 15 September in the away game against lower tier FC Meyrin being substituted in after 74 minutes as Basel won 3–0 to progress to the next round. He played his first game in the 2019–20 UEFA Europa League group stage on 19 September as Basel won 5–0 at home in the St. Jakob-Park against Russian team Krasnodar. He then made his domestic league debut on 22 September as Basel played a 1–1 draw with Young Boys in the Stadion Wankdorf. Cabral scored his first goal for his new club in the next league match one week later, on 25 September, as Basel won 4–0 at home against Zürich. During his next match just four days later, on 29 September, he scored two goals as Basel won 3–0 against Luzern.

On 29 June 2020, the club announced that Cabral, whose loan had come to the end, was signed permanently. He scored his first hat-trick for his club on 8 August 2021 against Servette, in fact he scored four goals as Basel won 5–1. He scored his first hat-trick at international level just two weeks later, on 19 August, in the 2021–22 UEFA Europa Conference League play-off match as Basel won 3–1 at home against Swedish club Hammarby IF.

FCB announced on 29 January 2022 that their top-scorer  Cabral had transferred out to Fiorentina. In his two and a half years with the club Cabral had  a total of 118 appearances for Basel scoring a total of 75 goals. 77 of these games were in the Super League, 3 in the Swiss Cup, 26 in the European competitions and 12 were test matches. He scored 46 goals in the domestic league, 2 in the cup, 17 in the European competitions and the other 10 were scored during the tests.

Fiorentina
On 29 January 2022, Cabral joined Serie A side Fiorentina. He scored his first goal on 26 February 2022, in a 2–1 defeat against Sassuolo.

International career

Youth
Cabral has represented Brazil at the U-23 level, playing in a friendly match against Colombia in September 2019.

Senior
In October 2021, Cabral received his first call-up to the Brazilian senior team for 2022 FIFA World Cup qualification matches as an injury replacement for Matheus Cunha.

Career statistics

Honours
Ceará
Campeonato Cearense: 2017, 2018
Individual
Swiss Super League Player of the Year: 2020–21
Swiss Super League Team of the Year: 2020–21, 2021–22
Swiss Super League Top Goalscorer: 2020–21

References

External links
Profile at the ACF Fiorentina website 

1998 births
Living people
People from Campina Grande
Brazilian footballers
Association football forwards
Brazil youth international footballers
Campeonato Brasileiro Série A players
Campeonato Brasileiro Série B players
Swiss Super League players
Serie A players
Ceará Sporting Club players
Sociedade Esportiva Palmeiras players
FC Basel players
ACF Fiorentina players
Brazilian expatriate footballers
Brazilian expatriate sportspeople in Switzerland
Expatriate footballers in Switzerland
Brazilian expatriate sportspeople in Italy
Expatriate footballers in Italy
Sportspeople from Paraíba